In mathematics, the qualifier pointwise is used to indicate that a certain property is defined by considering each value  of some function  An important class of pointwise concepts are the pointwise operations, that is, operations defined on functions by applying the operations to function values separately for each point in the domain of definition. Important relations can also be defined pointwise.

Pointwise operations

Formal definition

Commonly, o and O are denoted by the same symbol. A similar definition is used for unary operations o, and for operations of other arity.

Examples

where .

See also pointwise product, and scalar.

An example of an operation on functions which is not pointwise is convolution.

Properties
Pointwise operations inherit such properties as associativity, commutativity and distributivity from corresponding operations on the codomain. 
If   is some algebraic structure, the set of all functions  to the carrier set of  can be turned into an algebraic structure of the same type in an analogous way.

Componentwise operations 
Componentwise operations are usually defined on vectors, where vectors are elements of the set  for some natural number  and some field .

Componentwise operations can be defined on matrices. Matrix addition, where  is a componentwise operation while matrix multiplication is not.

A tuple can be regarded as a function, and a vector is a tuple. Therefore, any vector  corresponds to the function  such that , and any componentwise operation on vectors is the pointwise operation on functions corresponding to those vectors.

Pointwise relations 
In order theory it is common to define a pointwise partial order on functions. With A, B posets, the set of functions A → B can be ordered by f ≤ g if and only if (∀x ∈ A) f(x) ≤ g(x). Pointwise orders also inherit some properties of the underlying posets. For instance if A and B are continuous lattices, then so is the set of functions A → B with pointwise order. Using the pointwise order on functions one can concisely define other important notions, for instance:

 A closure operator c on a poset P is a monotone and idempotent self-map on P (i.e. a projection operator) with the additional property that idA ≤ c, where id is the identity function.
 Similarly, a projection operator k is called a kernel operator if and only if k ≤ idA.

An example of an infinitary pointwise relation is pointwise convergence of functions—a sequence of functions

with

converges pointwise to a function  if for each  in

Notes

References 
For order theory examples:
 T. S. Blyth, Lattices and Ordered Algebraic Structures, Springer, 2005, .
 G. Gierz, K. H. Hofmann, K. Keimel, J. D. Lawson, M. Mislove, D. S. Scott: Continuous Lattices and Domains, Cambridge University Press, 2003.

Mathematical terminology